Was Here is the first live album from American alternative hip hop sextet Subtle.

Track listing

References

Subtle (band) albums
2008 live albums